Wawrzyńcowice , German Lorenzdorf is a village in the administrative district of Gmina Strzeleczki (Gemeinde Klein Strehlitz), within Krapkowice County, Opole Voivodeship, in the south-western Polish region of Upper Silesia.

Since 2006 the village, like the rest of the commune, has been bilingual in German and Polish.

The village has a population of 86 people.

History
The village was first mentioned in 1679 as Wawrzinowice. The town's name derived from the name Lawrence (Wawrzyniec in Polish, Lorenz in German), which is also the derivation of the village's German name, Lorenzdorf (Lawrence's village). Initially the village was in the possession of the noble House of Schaffgotsch, then in 1821 it passed to Baron Seherr-Thoss, who sold it in the 1860s to Major Thiele-Winckler von Miechowitz, whose family owned the village until World War II. Before 1945 it belonged to the district of Landkreis Neustadt O.S.

In 1945 Silesia was given to Poland and the German population of Lorenzdorf was largely expelled. The village was renamed Wawrzyńcowice and annexed to the newly created Silesian Voivodeship. In 1950 it was reassigned to Opole Voivodeship, and in 1999 reassigned from Prudnik County (formerly Neustadt O.S.) to Krapkowice County. On 17 May 2006 the entire commune of Strzelecki/Klein Strehlitz was declared bilingual in German and Polish, and on 24 November 2008 the old name German name Lorenzdorf was also made official.

References

Villages in Krapkowice County